The following is a timeline of the history of the city of Medina, Saudi Arabia.

Prior to 20th century

 6th C. CE - Yathrib settled "by three Jewish tribes, the Banu Quynuqa, the Banu Qurayza, and the Banu Nadir."
 622 CE / 0-1 H
 Muhammad arrives from Mecca, with followers (muhajirun).
 Quba Mosque and Al-Masjid al-Nabawi (Mosque of the Prophet) built.
 Yathrib renamed "Medina."
 Baqi Cemetery established.
 623 CE - Masjid al-Qiblatayn (Mosque of the two Qiblas) built.
 624 CE - Prophet's House built.
 627
 March–April: Battle of the Trench.
 Constitution of Medina created (approximate date).
 630 - Medina and Mecca "established as the holy cities of Islam."
 632 CE / 11 H
 8 June: Death of Muhammad.
 Abu Bakr appointed caliph; Rashidun Caliphate established.
 634 - Umar becomes caliph.
 639 - Hijri year calendar devised.
 644 - Uthman ibn Affan becomes caliph.
 656 - Ali becomes caliph and moves capital from Medina to Kufa.
 661 - Umayyad Caliphate established; capital moved from Medina to Damascus.
 662 - Marwan ibn al-Hakam becomes Governor of Madina.
 683 - Medina sacked by Umayyads.
 8th century - Sharia (Islamic law) codified in Medina.
 706 - Umar ibn Abd al-Aziz becomes Governor of Madina.
 707 - Al-Masjid al-Nabawi rebuilt.
 975 - City wall built.
 1162 - City wall expanded.
 1266 - Volcanic eruption within an hour's distance.
 1513 - Al-Hajjaria waqf (trust) incorporated.
 1517 - Ottoman Turks in power.
 1804 - Wahhabis in power.
 1812 - November: Battle of Medina (1812); Turks in power.
 1837 - Al-Masjid an-Nabawi dome painted green.
 1872 - Medina becomes part of the Ottoman Hejaz Vilayet.
 1896 - Telephone line installed.
 1900 - Population (estimate): 16,000 to 20,000.

20th century

 1908 - Hejaz Railway (Damascus-Medina) begins operating.
 1916 - Siege of Medina begins.
 1919 - January: Siege of Medina ends; Arabs in power.
 1920 - Hejaz Railway (Damascus-Medina) stops operating.
 1925 - Medina becomes part of the Kingdom of Saudi Arabia.
 1937 - Italian-Muslim hospital founded.
 1953 - Baqi Cemetery expanded.
 1955 - Al-Masjid al-Nabawi enlarged.
 1961 - Islamic University of Madinah established.
 1974
 Mohammad Airport opens.
 Population: 198,186.
 1985 - King Fahd Complex for the Printing of the Holy Quran begins operating.
 1986 - Quba Mosque rebuilt.

21st century

 2001 - 15 March: Chechen hijacking of Russian aircraft.
 2003 - Taibah University established.
 2006 - Hejaz Railway Museum opens.
 2010 - Population: 1,100,093.
 2014
 8 February: 2014 Medina hotel fire.
 Air pollution in Medina reaches annual mean of 65 PM2.5 and 153 PM10, much higher than recommended.
 2016 - 4 July: bombing at Prophet's Mosque.

See also
 History of Medina
 Other names of Medina
 Timelines of other cities in Saudi Arabia: Jeddah, Mecca, Riyadh

References

Bibliography

Published in 19th century
 
 
 
 

Published in 20th century
 
 
 
  (written in 9th/10th century)
 
 
 
 
 

Published in 21st century

External links

Years in Saudi Arabia
History of Medina
Medina